The Finsterwalde Solar Park was, in November 2010, the world's largest photovoltaic plant with 80.7 MWp.

The first phase of the project was commissioned in 2009, the second and third in 2010.  All phases were developed by Unlimited Energy GmbH. Phase I was sold to LQ Energy GmbH, a joint venture of Q-Cells International and LDK Solar. In 2011, Finsterwalde I was sold to LHI Leasing, a joint venture of Landesbank Baden-Württemberg and Nord/LB.

In 2010, Unlimited Energy sold phase II and III to Q-Cells International. In 2011, Q-Cells sold Finsterwalde II and III to Blue Forrest Solar Holding, a joint venture of DIF Infrastructure and the NIBC European Infrastructure Fund.

See also 

Photovoltaic power station
List of photovoltaic power stations

References 

Photovoltaic power stations in Germany
Economy of Brandenburg
Elbe-Elster Land